The Branded Man is a 1918 American short silent Western film starring Hoot Gibson.

Cast
 Hoot Gibson as Sheriff
 Donna Kee as John Ewing
 Helen Gibson as Helen Ewing
 Millard K. Wilson as Jim Calvert (credited as M.K. Wilson)
 G. Raymond Nye as Val Heywood
 Noble Johnson as Trovio Valdez

Reception
Like many American films of the time, The Branded Man was subject to restrictions and cuts by city and state film censorship boards. For example, the Chicago Board of Censors cut, in Reel 1, two scenes of heating iron and closeup of hot iron approaching man, second attack scene on Ewing, three holdup scenes, Reel 2, dividing spoils, holdup of man in cabin, two scenes of taking money in cabin, and shooting at the posse.

See also
 List of American films of 1918
 Hoot Gibson filmography

References

External links
 

1918 films
1918 short films
1918 Western (genre) films
American black-and-white films
American silent short films
Silent American Western (genre) films
1910s American films